Mass in F Minor is a 1968 album by American rock band The Electric Prunes.

Mass in F Minor may also refer to:

Mass No. 3, or Mass in F Minor, WAB 28, by Anton Bruckner (first performed 1872)
Mass in F Minor by Josef Schnabel (1767–1831)
Two settings of Mass in F minor by George Whiting (1840–1923)
Mass in F minor, op. 22 (published 1846) by Bernhard Molique
Mass in F minor, op. 51 (1934), by Egon Wellesz